The Kiku River is a river in Shizuoka Prefecture, Japan.

References

Rivers of Shizuoka Prefecture
Rivers of Japan